James Douglas Beach (born October 12, 1991) is an American motorcycle racer. He currently races a Yamaha YZF-R1 in the MotoAmerica Superbike Championship.

Career
Born in Snoqualmie, Washington and based in Philpot, Kentucky, Beach won the Red Bull MotoGP Rookies Cup in 2008 and the AMA Pro Supersport East Championship in 2010. In 2011 he made a one-off appearance in the Moto2 World Championship, replacing Tommaso Lorenzetti for the Aeroport de Castelló team in the Indianapolis Grand Prix. After competing in the AMA Superbike Championship and the Daytona SportBike Championship from 2011 to 2014, in 2015 he won the MotoAmerica Supersport Championship. In 2016, Beach came four points short of winning his second consecutive MotoAmerica title. He won seven races in the Championship.2018 Champion MotoAmerica Supersport Series

Beach is currently being coached by former AMA racer Ken Hill.

Career statistics

Red Bull MotoGP Rookies Cup

Races by year
(key) (Races in bold indicate pole position, races in italics indicate fastest lap)

Grand Prix motorcycle racing

By season

By class

Races by year
(key) (Races in bold indicate pole position; races in italics indicate fastest lap)

References

External links

 
 

American motorcycle racers
Sportspeople from Washington (state)
People from Kentucky
People from Snoqualmie, Washington
Living people
1991 births
AMA Superbike Championship riders
AMA Supersport Championship riders
Moto2 World Championship riders